Leopold Czejka (born 14 November 1903, date of death unknown) was an Austrian international footballer.

References

1903 births
Year of death missing
Association football defenders
Austrian footballers
Austria international footballers
SK Rapid Wien players